Kopalina may refer to:

Kopalina, Lower Silesian Voivodeship (south-west Poland)
Kopalina, Greater Poland Voivodeship (west-central Poland)
Kopalina, Brzeg County in Opole Voivodeship (south-west Poland)
Kopalina, Krapkowice County in Opole Voivodeship (south-west Poland)
Kopalina, Gmina Domaszowice in Opole Voivodeship (south-west Poland)
Kopalina, Gmina Pokój in Opole Voivodeship (south-west Poland)